The Sentier NB Trail is a network of hiking trails in New Brunswick, Canada built on abandoned railways. The trails are mostly closed to motorized vehicles. The network is operated by the New Brunswick Trails Council, a non-profit organization. Some portions of the trail are also part of the Trans Canada Trail.

References

Hiking trails in New Brunswick
Trans Canada Trail
Rail trails in New Brunswick